Erald Deliallisi (born 12 March 1982 in Tiranë) is a former Albanian footballer.

References

1982 births
Living people
Footballers from Tirana
Albanian footballers
Association football midfielders
KS Lushnja players
KF Tirana players
FK Dinamo Tirana players
KF Teuta Durrës players
FC Kamza players
Kategoria Superiore players
Kategoria e Parë players